Merašice is a village and municipality in Hlohovec District in the Trnava Region of western Slovakia.

History
In historical records the village was first mentioned in 1390.

Geography
The municipality lies at an altitude of 189 metres and covers an area of 4.938 km². It has a population of about 387 people.

References

External links
https://web.archive.org/web/20080208225314/http://www.statistics.sk/mosmis/eng/run.html

Villages and municipalities in Hlohovec District